Patinopecten caurinus is a species of bivalve belonging to the family Pectinidae.

The species is found in Japan and Western America.

References

Pectinidae